The 2012 Amgen Tour of California was the seventh running of the Tour of California cycling stage race. It was held from May 13–20, and was rated as a 2.HC event on the UCI America Tour. It began in Santa Rosa and concluded in front of Los Angeles's Staples Center after eight stages. As per the Union Cycliste Internationale rules adopted in 2011, the use of race radios was prohibited, since only the events which are designated UCI World Tour events can use the devices.

The event was marked by two major performances: 's Robert Gesink winning Stage 7 finishing in Mount Baldy to secure the overall classification victory and Peter Sagan of  dominating the sprint finishes, taking 5 stage wins and the sprinter jersey.

Participating teams
Sixteen teams were participating in the Tour of California, including eight UCI ProTeams, four UCI Professional Continental teams, and four UCI Continental teams. They were:

 
 
 
 
 
 
 Team Exergy

Stages

Stage 1

May 13, 2012 — Santa Rosa to Santa Rosa,  —  Intermediate stage

Eight men escaped very early in the race and built a sizable gap with the peloton. Among them was Canadian David Boily, who won all four of the King of the Mountains competitions along the way, claiming the red jersey. The climbs were graded category 3 and 4, and the break held a maximum lead of eleven minutes. With  to go in the race, the 3 remaining breakaway companions, Ben Jacques-Maynes, Maxime Bouet and Jeff Louder shook hands to congratulate each other for the nice effort since the bunch was 10 seconds behind them and reeled them in moments later. Almost at the same time the peloton caught the break, Peter Sagan had a puncture. His teammate Daniel Oss piloted him in the last few kilometers, and Sagan out sprinted his rivals.

Stage 2
May 14, 2012 — San Francisco to Santa Cruz County,  —  Intermediate stage

Race leader Peter Sagan was part of a crash that occurred near the top of the Empire Grade climb, but he could recover and got back on his bike after some on-the-fly repairs by the team's mechanic. He was rewarded for his efforts with the "Most Aggressive rider" jersey. A bunch composed of about 60 units came charging in Santa Cruz, with all the overall classification contenders present. The  train dragged Sagan to the last corner, a right bend with the finish line only a couple hundred meters away. Sagan was first out of the corner and accelerated to the finish, taking his second victory in a row.

Stage 3

May 15, 2012 — San Jose to Livermore,  —  Intermediate stage

For the first time in the race's history, the riders were set to climb Mount Diablo (Category 2) about midway through the course. The crowd of spectators was densely packed at that well-known landmark. A breakaway composed of 4 men formed atop the first climb of the day, Calaveras Road (Category 4), including Sebastian Salas of  whose team manager stated prior to the stage that their main objective was now the red jersey awarded to the best climber. Salas did exactly what his team had planned, raking in enough points to take the lead in the King of the Mountains competition. Sagan stated after his third consecutive success that he was surprised to be a part of the finale since the Patterson Pass' climb was a steep one and was situated very close to the end of the race.

Stage 4
May 16, 2012 — Sonora to Clovis,  —  Mountain stage
The longest stage of the 2012 Tour of California was also the one with the greatest number of categorized climbs, since the peloton had to tackle with six of them and compose with high temperatures. Red jersey wearer Sebastian Salas conquered the first difficulty of the day in front of the peloton, ultimately earning enough points to keep the best climber's jersey at the end of the stage. A number of breaks formed, but ultimately all of them were swallowed by the bunch, the most significant effort being led by a group of 11 riders with a maximum lead of 5' 25". After going past the last climb of the day, category 3 Crane Valley Road, the peloton regrouped on the descent to Clovis with all the favorites. With this performance, Sagan broke the record for most Tour of California victories with seven, surpassing Levi Leipheimer.

Stage 5
May 17, 2012 — Bakersfield, individual time trial (ITT) —  Flat stage

The event was taking place under a sunny sky and temperatures exceeding . David Zabriskie of  took the yellow jersey off the shoulders of Peter Sagan, with an advantage of 3' 27" over the former race leader, who finished in 52nd position. Zabriskie stopped the clock at 35' 59", and raced wearing a Captain America themed skinsuit. Forty-year-old  rider Jens Voigt came in second place, with American Tejay van Garderen of  rounding up the podium. Following the  effort, the victor stated: “I came out here in February and videotaped the course. I had a few spots where I wanted to soft pedal but maintain speed. [...] Any course where I don’t have to get out of the aerobars is good for me.” Zabriskie had a 40 seconds deficit in the general classification coming into the stage.

Stage 6
May 18, 2012 — Palmdale to Big Bear Lake,  —  Mountain stage
Seven riders broke away almost from the starting line, including David Boily and Sebastian Salas, who were battling it out for the red jersey. Boily came first atop the first difficulty of the day, but ultimately could not keep up with the pace of the breakaway and Salas remained the leader of the mountain's competition as the stage finished. Also included in this early break was  rider Sylvain Georges, who remained in the escapee's bunch until it was reduced to two riders, very late in the stage. Sebastian Salas, approaching the last climb that would lead the race to Big Bear Lake, reportedly told Georges that he did not have the legs to continue cooperating with him, with  still to go. He managed to hold on to sail to victory, taking the second win of the day and of the year for his team, since Sébastien Hinault took the third stage of Circuit de Lorraine a little earlier in the day. As he crossed the finish line, the bunch was in his back-view mirror, and Peter Sagan sprinted his way to second place.

Stage 7
May 19, 2012 — Ontario to Mount Baldy,  —  Mountain stage
Right from the start, a breakaway formed, initiated by Jens Voigt and Dries Devenyns. After  of racing, the break had ballooned to 14 riders, including four units from the  squad. Back in the group, general classification contender Tejay van Garderen of  survived a scare when he punctured while descending the first categorized difficulty of the day, but a teammate was there to promptly give him his wheel. At one point, the duo enjoyed a 3' 50" advantage over the bunch and David Zabriskie, making Horner the virtual leader. 's Robert Gesink then accelerated toward the top of the climb, dropping everyone in his group except Tom Danielson who was the last to go away. Gesink caught Atapuma near the final kilometer banner, was passed by the Colombian on the inside in the penultimate turn, passed him again but took the final left bend very wide, almost colliding with the barriers. Gesink produced a last sprint that would carry him over the line as the victor. With that victory, Gesink took the yellow jersey. He stated: “This is amazing. At the end of last year I crashed and broke my leg. In January I still had to learn how to walk. Now I’m back. I’ve been working really, really hard the last few months.”

Stage 8
May 20, 2012 — Beverly Hills to Los Angeles,  —  Flat stage
A breakaway occurred, but it never gained more than a 35 seconds advantage over the field, since the  team dictated a fast pace to protect Robert Gesink's lead. The  train took care of the pacing from that point, trying to set up a win for Tom Boonen, but to no avail: Peter Sagan of the  squad got the better of the massive sprint, taking his fifth win of this edition of the Tour.

The 2012 Tour of California was the last professional event in 's Robbie McEwen's career, as he had stated he would retire by the end of the race. He humorously said after the arrival: "This was a good race to pick as my last because I suffered so much this week I won't miss it." The overall classification winner Robert Gesink dedicated his victory to the memory of his father, who died as a result of a cycling accident in October 2010. In his own words: "I dedicate this win for my father. For me emotionally it is something really big to be back at this high level and to win a stage here, the toughest stage of all. It's a good thing to be back in California and to be winning again."

Classification leadership

In the 2012 Tour of California, six different jerseys were awarded. For the general classification, calculated by adding the finishing times of the stages per cyclist, the leader received a yellow jersey. This classification is considered the most important of the Tour of California, and the winner of the general classification was considered the winner of the Tour of California.

Additionally, there was also a sprints classification, akin to what is called the points classification in other races, which awarded a green jersey. In the sprints classification, cyclists received points for finishing in the top 10 in a stage. The winner received 15 points, second place 12, third 10, fourth 7, and one point less per place down the line, to a single point for tenth. In addition, some points could be won in intermediate sprints.

There was also a mountains classification, which awarded a red jersey. In the mountains classifications, points were won by reaching the top of a mountain before other cyclists. Each climb was categorized, either first, second, third, or fourth category, with more points available for the harder climbs.

There was also a youth classification. This classification was calculated the same way as the general classification, but only young cyclists (under 23) were included. The leader of the young rider classification received a gold and white jersey.

The other jerseys were not awarded on the basis of a time or points-based classification. A white jersey with blue trim was awarded for each stage's "Most Courageous" rider, akin to the combativity award in the Tour de France. The rider who received this award wore a blue jersey in the next stage. Unlike the Tour de France's combativity award, there was no overall award given. A black jersey for the Most Aggressive rider on each stage was also awarded, but this one was only worn on the podiums and not in competition.

There was also a classification for teams. In this classification, the times of the best three cyclists per stage were added, and the team with the lowest time was the leader.

References

External links

Tour of California
Tour of California
Tour of California
2012 in sports in California